Miss Universe Dominicana 2001 was held on April 9, 2001. There were 26 candidates, representing provinces and municipalities, who entered. The winner would represent the Dominican Republic at Miss Universe 2001 and Miss América Latina 2002. The Miss Mundo Dominicana would enter Miss World 2001. The first runner up would enter in Miss Atlántico Internacional 2002. The second runner up would enter in Reinado Internacional del Café 2001. The third runner up would enter in Miss Intercontinental 2001. The rest of finalist entered different pageants. 16 Provinces, 8 Municipalities and 2 Dominican Communities had entered.

Results

Delegates

External links
http://dr1.com/news/2001/dnews040901.shtml

Miss Dominican Republic
2001 in the Dominican Republic
2001 beauty pageants